This article lists the confirmed squads for the 2018 Women's Hockey World Cup tournament to be held in London, England between 21 July and 5 August 2018.

Pool A

China
The squad was announced on 11 June 2018.

Head coach: Jamilon Mülders

Gu Bingfeng (C)
Song Xiaoming
Cui Qiuxia (C)
Xu Wenyu
Peng Yang
Guo Qiu
Ou Zixia (C)
Yong Jing
Zhang Xiaoxue
He Jiangxin
Liu Meng
Chen Yi (GK)
Wang Shumin
Chen Yang
Tu Yidan
Wu Qiong
Zhong Jiaqi
Ye Jiao (GK)

Italy
The squad was announced on 4 July 2018.

Head coach: Roberto Carta

Celina Traverso
Valentina Braconi
Eugenia Bianchi
Eugenia Garraffo
Dalila Mirabella
Martina Chirico (GK)
Elisabetta Pacella
Mercedes Socino
Chiara Tiddi (C)
Federica Carta
Jasbeer Singh
Agata Wybieralska
Clara Cusimano (GK)
Maryna Vynohradova
Giuliana Ruggieri
Lara Oviedo
Ivanna Pessina
Marcela Casale

Netherlands
The squad was announced on 3 July 2018.

Head coach: Alyson Annan

<li value=1>Anne Veenendaal (GK)
<li value=3>Sanne Koolen
<li value=4>Kitty van Male
<li value=5>Malou Pheninckx
<li value=6>Laurien Leurink
<li value=7>Xan de Waard
<li value=8>Marloes Keetels
<li value=9>Carlien Dirkse van den Heuvel (C)
<li value=10>Kelly Jonker
<li value=12>Lidewij Welten
<li value=13>Caia van Maasakker
<li value=15>Frédérique Matla
<li value=17>Ireen van den Assem
<li value=20>Laura Nunnink
<li value=21>Lauren Stam
<li value=22>Josine Koning (GK)
<li value=23>Margot van Geffen
<li value=24>Eva de Goede

South Korea
The squad was announced on 4 July 2018.

Head coach: Huh Sang-young

<li value=2>Choi Su-ji
<li value=4>Kim Young-ran (C)
<li value=5>Lee Yu-rim
<li value=6>Bae So-ra (GK)
<li value=8>An Hyo-ju
<li value=10>Park Mi-hyun
<li value=11>Park Seung-a
<li value=12>Lee Young-sil
<li value=13>Cho Eun-ji
<li value=14>Cho Yun-kyoung
<li value=16>Cheon Seul-ki
<li value=17>Kim Ok-ju
<li value=18>Kim Bo-mi
<li value=19>Cho Hye-jin
<li value=21>Shin Hye-jeong
<li value=22>Jang Hee-sun
<li value=23>Lee Yu-ri
<li value=31>Hwang Hyeon-a (GK)

Pool B

England
The squad was announced on 4 July 2018.

Head coach: Danny Kerry

<li value=1>Maddie Hinch (GK)
<li value=3>Kathryn Lane
<li value=4>Laura Unsworth
<li value=5>Sarah Haycroft
<li value=6>Anna Toman
<li value=7>Hannah Martin
<li value=9>Susannah Townsend
<li value=11>Suzy Petty
<li value=13>Ellie Rayer
<li value=15>Alex Danson (C)
<li value=18>Giselle Ansley
<li value=19>Sophie Bray
<li value=20>Hollie Webb
<li value=21>Ellie Watton
<li value=23>Amy Tennant (GK)
<li value=26>Lily Owsley
<li value=27>Jo Hunter
<li value=31>Grace Balsdon

India
The squad was announced on 29 June 2018.

Head coach: Sjoerd Marijne

Ireland
Head coach: Graham Shaw

United States
The squad was announced on 3 July 2018.

Head coach: Janneke Schopman

Erin Matson
Stefanie Fee
<li value=5>Melissa González (C)
<li value=9>Michelle Vittese
<li value=10>Jill Funk
<li value=12>Amanda Magadan
<li value=13>Ashley Hoffman
<li value=14>Julia Young
<li value=19>Lauren Moyer
<li value=20>Ali Froede
<li value=21>Nicole Woods
<li value=22>Lauren Blazing (GK)
<li value=23>Tara Vittese
<li value=24>Kathleen Sharkey
<li value=26>Margaux Paolino
<li value=28>Caitlin Van Sickle
<li value=29>Alyssa Manley
<li value=31>Jaclyn Briggs (GK)

Pool C

Argentina
The squad was announced on 24 May 2018.

Head coach: Agustín Corradini

<li value=1>Belén Succi (GK)
<li value=4>Eugenia Trinchinetti
<li value=5>Agostina Alonso
<li value=6>Bianca Donati
<li value=7>Martina Cavallero
<li value=10>Magdalena Fernández Ladra
<li value=12>Delfina Merino (C)
<li value=14>Agustina Habif
<li value=15>María José Granatto
<li value=16>Florencia Habif
<li value=17>Rocío Sánchez Moccia
<li value=19>Agustina Albertario
<li value=20>Lucina von der Heyde
<li value=26>Paula Ortiz
<li value=27>Noel Barrionuevo
<li value=28>Julieta Jankunas
<li value=29>Julia Gomes Fantasia
<li value=31>Florencia Mutio (GK)

Germany
The squad was announced on 25 June 2018.

Head coach: Xavier Reckinger

<li value=3>Amelie Wortmann
<li value=4>Nike Lorenz
<li value=5>Selin Oruz
<li value=6>Hannah Gablać
<li value=8>Anne Schröder
<li value=9>Elisa Gräve
<li value=11>Lena Micheel
<li value=12>Charlotte Stapenhorst
<li value=14>Janne Müller-Wieland (C)
<li value=15>Nathalie Kubalski (GK)
<li value=17>Jana Teschke
<li value=18>Lisa Hahn
<li value=19>Maike Schaunig
<li value=20>Julia Ciupka (GK)
<li value=21>Franzisca Hauke
<li value=22>Cécile Pieper
<li value=23>Marie Mävers
<li value=25>Viktoria Huse

South Africa
The squad was announced on 7 June 2018.

Head coach: Sheldon Rostron

<li value=4>Nicole Walraven
<li value=5>Simone Gouws
<li value=8>Kristen Paton
<li value=10>Shelley Russell
<li value=11>Kara-Lee Botes
<li value=12>Dirkie Chamberlain
<li value=13>Lisa-Marie Deetlefs
<li value=16>Erin Hunter
<li value=17>Candice Manuel
<li value=19>Lilian du Plessis
<li value=20>Nicolene Terblanche
<li value=21>Ongeziwe Mali
<li value=24>Phumelela Mbande (GK)
<li value=27>Jade Mayne
<li value=28>Quanita Bobbs
<li value=29>Tarryn Glasby
<li value=30>Sulette Damons (C)
<li value=31>Marlize van Tonder (GK)

Spain
The squad was announced on 5 July 2018.

Head coach: Adrian Lock

<li value=1>María Ruiz (GK)
<li value=2>Rocío Gutiérrez
<li value=7>Carlota Petchamé
<li value=8>Carola Salvatella
<li value=9>María López
<li value=10>Berta Bonastre
<li value=11>Cristina Guinea
<li value=12>Carmen Cano
<li value=15>Maialen García
<li value=17>Lola Riera
<li value=18>Julia Pons
<li value=19>Begoña García Grau
<li value=20>Xantal Giné
<li value=21>Beatriz Pérez
<li value=23>Georgina Oliva (c)
<li value=25>Alicia Magaz
<li value=29>Lucía Jiménez
<li value=32>Melanie García (GK)

Pool D

Australia
The squad was announced on 26 June 2018.

Head coach: Paul Gaudoin

|caps=31|club=NSW Arrows|clubnat=AUS}}
|caps=182|club=VIC Vipers|clubnat=AUS}}

|caps=201|club=QLD Scorchers|clubnat=AUS}}
|caps=37|club=QLD Scorchers|clubnat=AUS}}
|caps=133|club=SA Suns|clubnat=AUS}}
|caps=154|club=Canberra Strikers|clubnat=AUS}}
|caps=37|club=NSW Arrows|clubnat=AUS}}
|caps=66|club=NSW Arrows|clubnat=AUS}}

|caps=43|club=QLD Scorchers|clubnat=AUS}}
|caps=52|club=QLD Scorchers|clubnat=AUS}}
|caps=14|club=Canberra Strikers|clubnat=AUS}}
|caps=24|club=VIC Vipers|clubnat=AUS}}

|caps=8|club=QLD Scorchers|clubnat=AUS}}
|caps=128|club=NT Pearls|clubnat=AUS}}
|caps=106|club=VIC Vipers|clubnat=AUS}}
|caps=85|club=WA Diamonds|clubnat=AUS}}
|caps=200|club=NSW Arrows|clubnat=AUS}}
|caps=48|club=NSW Arrows|clubnat=AUS}}

Belgium
The squad was announced on 6 July 2018.

Head coach: Niels Thiessen

<li value=2>Sophie Limauge
<li value=3>Louise Cavenaile
<li value=4>Aline Fobe
<li value=6>Anouk Raes (C)
<li value=7>Judith Vandermeiren
<li value=8>Emma Puvrez
<li value=10>Louise Versavel
<li value=11>Joanne Peeters
<li value=13>Alix Gerniers
<li value=15>Anne-Sophie Weyns
<li value=17>Michelle Struijk
<li value=19>Barbara Nelen
<li value=21>Aisling D'Hooghe (GK)
<li value=22>Stephanie Vanden Borre
<li value=23>Elena Sotgiu (GK)
<li value=25>Pauline Leclef
<li value=26>Lien Hillewaert
<li value=27>Jill Boon

Japan
The squad was announced on 22 June 2018.

Head coach: Anthony Farry

<li value=1>Megumi Kageyama (GK)
<li value=2>Natsuki Naito (C)
<li value=3>Mayumi Ono
<li value=5>Yu Asai
<li value=7>Hazuki Nagai
<li value=8>Yukari Mano
<li value=9>Akiko Kato
<li value=10>Minami Shimizu
<li value=11>Kana Nomura
<li value=12>Yuri Nagai
<li value=13>Miki Kozuka
<li value=14>Maho Segawa
<li value=15>Yui Ishibashi
<li value=16>Shihori Oikawa
<li value=20>Mami Karino
<li value=22>Motomi Kawamura
<li value=27>Aki Yamada
<li value=30>Erika Akaya (GK)

New Zealand
The squad was announced on 3 July 2018.

Head coach: Mark Hager

|caps=164|club=Midlands|clubnat=NZL}}
|caps=34|club=Auckland|clubnat=NZL}}

|caps=31|club=Midlands|clubnat=NZL}}
|caps=50|club=Midlands|clubnat=NZL}}
|caps=147|club=Northland|clubnat=NZL}}
|caps=191|club=Northland|clubnat=NZL}}
|caps=166|club=Auckland|clubnat=NZL}}
|caps=176|club=Midlands|clubnat=NZL}}

|caps=49|club=Midlands|clubnat=NZL}}
|caps=219|club=Midlands|clubnat=NZL}}

|caps=254|club=Northland|clubnat=NZL}}
|caps=264|club=Capital|clubnat=NZL}}

|caps=149|club=Auckland|clubnat=NZL}}
|caps=198|club=Canterbury|clubnat=NZL}}
|caps=79|club=Capital|clubnat=NZL}}
|caps=68|club=Midlands|clubnat=NZL}}
|caps=23|club=Northland|clubnat=NZL}}

References

squads
Women's Hockey World Cup squads